Siege of Trichinopoly may refer to:

 Siege of Trichinopoly (1741)
 Siege of Trichinopoly (1743)
 Siege of Trichinopoly (1751–52)

See also
 Battle of Trichinopolly (disambiguation)